The Army of the Revolution (Jaysh al-Thawra) was a Syrian rebel alliance affiliated with the Southern Front of the Free Syrian Army. It was composed of 5 FSA factions which mainly operated in the Daraa Governorate in southwestern Syria. One of its commanders stated that the group is a "temporary operations room" due to the separation between western and eastern Daraa, and that the "door is open" for other groups to join the alliance.

Member groups
Yarmouk Army
United Sham Front
Mu'tazz Billah Army
Martyr Walid Qaisi Brigade
Muhajireen and Ansar Brigade
Hasan ibn Ali Brigade
Dawn of Islam Division 
Free Nawa Forces
Free Nawa Brigade
Bani Umayya Brigade
Farouq Brigade
Omar Mukhtar Brigade
Southern Company 
Gaza Houran Brigade
Clear Victory Brigade
Muhammad the Conqueror Brigade
Soldiers of Islam Brigade
Martyr Ahmad al-Awad Brigade
Omar ibn al-Khattab Brigade
Lions of the South Brigade
Technical Battalion

Yarmouk Army

The Yarmouk Army (transliteration: Jaysh al-Yarmouk), originally known as the Yarmouk Brigade, is a prominent FSA rebel group operating in the Quneitra and Daraa governorates. The group is one of the units that has received BGM-71 TOW missiles. It joined the Southern Front on 14 February 2014 and the Hawks of the South coalition on 27 December 2014.

In January 2016, the United Sham Front joined the group.

Mu'tazz Billah Army

The Mu'tazz Billah Army (transliteration: Jaysh al-Mu'tazz Billah), formerly called the Mu'tazz Billah Brigade (transliteration: Liwa al-Mu'tazz Billah), named after al-Mu'tazz, is a FSA group active in Daraa. It also received TOW missiles from the Military Operations Center based in Jordan. The group has clashed with the Islamic Muthanna Movement. It was also previously part of the Daraa Military Council.

On 11 September 2017, Captain Bara Nabulsi was appointed as the general commander of the Mu'tazz Billah Army, replacing Colonel Khalid Nabulsi. Col. Nabulsi was previously the commander of the Southern Front's joint command operations room in 2014.

Muhajireen and Ansar Brigade
 
The Emigrants and Helpers Brigade (transliteration: Liwa al-Muhajireen wal-Ansar) was one of the earliest FSA groups formed in the Daraa Governorate. The group is affiliated with the Supreme Military Council and has received TOW and HJ-8 anti-tank missiles. It is one of the members of the Daraa Military Council. The group is led by Captain Iyad Khaddour and Khalid Fathallah, the former of which became the overall commander of the Army of the Revolution.

Hasan ibn Ali Brigade

Dawn of Islam Division
The Dawn of Islam Division (transliteration: Firqat Fajr al-Islam) is a Syrian rebel group operating in the Uthman and Tafas districts of Daraa city as well as in Busra al-Harir in the north-east of Daraa Governorate. Formed in February 2013, the group is led by Lieutenant Colonel Mohammed Hassan Salama. It is a merger between the Dawn of Islam Brigade and a number of smaller rebel groups. The group also received BGM-71 TOW anti-tank missiles. On 13 April 2015, the Dawn of Islam Division joined a number of other Southern Front groups in renouncing all ties with the al-Nusra Front. On 3 June 2017, it joined the Army of the Revolution.

References

Anti-government factions of the Syrian civil war
Anti-ISIL factions in Syria
Free Syrian Army